This is the Military intervention against ISIL ground order of battle, which lists the American forces and allies aerial assets that have taken part in the Military intervention against ISIL between June 2014 and the present day.

American

Units

Combined Joint Forces Land Component Command-Iraq
1st Infantry Division
 3rd Brigade Combat Team, 82nd Airborne Division (January – September 2015).
 2nd Battalion, 505th Infantry Regiment
 3rd Brigade Combat Team, 10th Mountain Division
 1st Brigade Combat Team, 10th Mountain Division (September 2015 – June 2016).
 2nd Brigade Combat Team, 101st Airborne Division (Air Assault) (June 2016 – January 2017).
1st Battalion, 502nd Infantry Regiment
 1st Battalion, 26th Infantry Regiment
 2nd Brigade Combat Team, 82nd Airborne Division (January 2017 – 2017)
 2nd Battalion, 325th Airborne Infantry Regiment
 218th Maneuver Enhancement Brigade (2019)
 4th Battalion, 118th Infantry Regiment, 30th Armored Brigade Combat Team (2019)

Installations

 Bakhira Base (SW of Mosul)
 Camp Swift (SE of Mosul)
 Forward Operating Base Union III (Baghdad)
 Patrol Base Al Tarab (W of Mosul)
 Shahrazad School (Mosul)
 Tactical assembly area Wyvern (Mosul)

British

Units

 Elements of 2nd Battalion, The Yorkshire Regiment (2 YORKS)
 Elements of 2nd Battalion, The Princess of Wales's Royal Regiment (2 PWRR)
 Elements of 1st Battalion, The Rifles (1 RIFLES) (July 2015 – January 2017)
 Elements of 2nd Battalion, The Duke of Lancaster's Regiment (2 LANCS)
 Elements of The Highlanders, 4th Battalion, Royal Regiment of Scotland (4 SCOTS) between February and July 2017.
 Elements of Unknown Battalion between July and December 2017.
 Elements of The Royal Highland Fusiliers, 2nd Battalion, The Royal Regiment of Scotland (2 SCOTS) from December 2017.
 5 Armoured Engineer Squadron, 22 Engineer Regiment during 2017.

Installations
 Al Asad Airbase
 Besmaya Range Complex
 Camp Taji (Taji)

See also
 Operation Inherent Resolve, name for American operations
 Operation Okra, name for Australian operations
 Operation Shader, name for British operations
 Operation Impact, name for Canadian operations
 Opération Chammal, name for French operations
Commander headquarters of ongoing operations:
  Combined Joint Task Force – Operation Inherent Resolve

References

War in Iraq (2013–2017)